The National Hockey League All-Star teams were first named at the end of the 1930–31 NHL season, to honor the best performers over the season at each position.

Representatives of the Professional Hockey Writers' Association vote for the all-star team at the end of the regular season.

The career leader in selections is Gordie Howe, named to a total of 21 all-star teams (12 first, 9 second), all with the Detroit Red Wings. Alexander Ovechkin is the only player in history to be named to both all-star teams in the same season (as a left and right winger respectively) because of a voting error. The career leader for selections as a player without being inducted into the Hockey Hall of Fame is John LeClair, who was named to a total of 5 all-star teams (2 first, 3 second).

Selections

Early years (1930–31 to 1941–42)

Original Six era (1942–43 to 1966–67)

Expansion era (1967–68 to 2004–05)

Post-lockout era (2005–06 to present)

Most selections 
The following table only lists players with at least eight total selections.

See also
NHL All-Star Game
NHL All-Rookie Team

References

All-Star Team
National Hockey League lists
Awards established in 1931